Pocahontas Fuel Company Store, also known as Norfolk Coal & Coke Company Store and Henderson Market, was a historic Pocahontas Fuel Company company store building located at Maybeury, McDowell County, West Virginia.  It was built before 1903, and was a one- to two-story wood-frame building on a stone foundation. It featured a pyramidal roof in one corner.

It was listed on the National Register of Historic Places in 1992. It was demolished sometime after March 2005.

See also 
 Pocahontas Fuel Company Store (Jenkinjones, West Virginia)
 Pocahontas Fuel Company Store (Switchback, West Virginia)

References

Commercial buildings on the National Register of Historic Places in West Virginia
Demolished buildings and structures in West Virginia
National Register of Historic Places in McDowell County, West Virginia
Company stores in the United States
U.S. Route 52